María Rosario Pilar Martínez Molina Baeza, professionally known by her stage name Charo, is a Spanish-American actress, singer, comedian, and flamenco guitarist.

Charo began playing guitar at the age of nine and trained under the famed Andrés Segovia. In 1966,  she married 65-year-old bandleader Xavier Cugat and moved to the United States with him. In the late 1960s and 1970s, she became a ubiquitous presence on American television, frequently appearing as a guest star on series such as Laugh-In, Fantasy Island, The Love Boat, and The Tonight Show Starring Johnny Carson. She is known for her uninhibited and exuberant manner, vague age, heavy Spanish accent, and catchphrase "cuchi-cuchi."

As a musician, Charo has performed and recorded in various styles for five decades. She released a series of disco recordings in the 1970s with Salsoul Records, most notably Dance a Little Bit Closer (1977). In 1995, her flamenco album Guitar Passion (1994) won the Female Pop Album of the Year award at the Billboard International Latin Music Conference and was named best female Latin pop album by Billboard. In an interview, she said, "Around the world I am known as a great musician. But in America I am known as the cuchi-cuchi girl. That's okay, because cuchi-cuchi has taken me all the way to the bank."

Early life
Charo was born in the city of Murcia, Spain. Her birth date has been a matter of some dispute (see 'Birth year controversy' below). Her Spanish passport gives her name as María del Rosario Mercedes Pilar Martínez Molina Baeza.

Charo has claimed she was enrolled in a convent school until the age of 15, when a nun told her that she belonged in show business. In the most colorful version of her childhood, Charo's grandmother hired a music professor to give her weekly classical guitar lessons, and he became the first man to enter the convent.

In a 2005 interview, she reminisced: "The institution had great young teachers and students. Everything was a charity. Mr. Segovia, between concerts that's when he'd come, and if you'd been there a year and you weren't good, you'd go out and they would give your place to another young kid."
Charo has stated in several interviews that she graduated with honors at age 16.

Bandleader Xavier Cugat, "discovered" her while in Spain filming a television special in 1964  They wed on August 7, 1966. An April 1966 column by Earl Wilson on the couple's wedding plans announced: "Sixty-year-old Xavier Cugat and his 20-year-old Spanish girlfriend and singing star Charo hope to marry in San Cugat, Spain, in a few days if Cugat can convince church authorities his two divorces should not be counted against him since he wasn't married in church."

They were the first couple to be wed at Caesars Palace in Las Vegas. Charo later claimed that her marriage to Cugat was merely a business contract, a way for him to legally bring her to the United States.

Birth year controversy
Charo's year of birth is the subject of dispute. Her Spanish birth certificate and passport, as well as her American naturalization papers, give her birthdate as March 13, 1941. She later claimed she was born in 1947, then changed it to 1949. In 1977, she asserted in a court hearing that her passport and naturalization papers were incorrect and that her birthdate was January 15, 1951.

Several newspaper articles around the time of her wedding to Cugat gave Charo's age as 17.  Others referred to her as Cugat's "18-year-old protégée." An April 1966 column on the wedding plans stated that she was 20 and Cugat was 60. Many sources identified her as 21 on the day of her wedding.

Later, when asserting her birthdate was 1951, she claimed her parents allowed her to falsify her age to appear older when marrying Cugat. However, that would have made her 15 at the time, contradicting her claim to have graduated from school at 16, not yet having begun her performing career. She has never clarified the discrepancy. 

In October 1977, the same year in which Charo filed for divorce from Cugat and became a naturalized American citizen, judge Roger Foley in Las Vegas adjudicated the 1951 birth year to be official. Charo provided sworn affidavits from her parents, although the claim has been viewed with skepticism. Commenting on the disputes over her age, she has said that the public's disbelief could prove advantageous: "But if people really believe I'm older, that's fine. Don't be surprised if I come out with my own cosmetics, a new energy bar, and maybe some vitamins."

Career

1970s
Charo was highly visible throughout the 1970s, appearing eight times on The Love Boat, and on variety and talk shows such as Donny & Marie, Tony Orlando and Dawn, The Captain and Tennille, The John Davidson Show, The Mike Douglas Show (which she guest-hosted at least once) and the short-lived The Brady Bunch Variety Hour.

By October of that year, Charo was promoting a TV special slated for November, but it did not actually appear until May 1976.

A TV listing for August 24, 1976 shows what appears to be an unsold pilot airing on ABC at 8:30 p.m. CST: "Charo and the Sergeant—Situation comedy starring Charo Cugat. Charo's first U.S. job is to be a dancer at an off-limits nightclub, and her conservative Marine Corps husband finds out. The few episodes that were taped ended up being broadcast on the American Armed Forces Network overseas."

By the late 1970s, Charo was being mentioned as an example of how overexposure could damage a celebrity. One such article quoted the "Q score" of Performer Q, Steve Levitt's celebrity popularity rating service, to show that her popularity declined slightly even as her familiarity increased:

2000s

She was named Best Flamenco Guitarist in Guitar Player Magazine's readers' poll twice.

Charo returned to the dance-music scene in June 2008 with the single "España Cañi," which was released through Universal Wave Records.

On March 1, 2017, Charo was revealed a contestant for Season 24 of Dancing with the Stars, paired with professional dancer Keo Motsepe. On April 3, 2017, they were the second couple eliminated from the competition and finished in 11th place.

Personal life
In 1977, she became a naturalized citizen of the United States. That year, she filed for divorce from Cugat, which was granted on April 14, 1978.

On August 11, 1978, she married her second husband, producer Kjell Rasten, in South Lake Tahoe, California. He soon became her manager. They have one child, son Shel Rasten (born 1981), who is the drummer for the heavy metal band Treazen.

They moved to Hawaii, but eventually moved back to Beverly Hills.

Rasten died by suicide on February 18, 2019 at the age of 78. Charo publicly stated: "In recent years, his health began to decline and he developed a rare and horrible skin disease called bullous pemphigoid. He also became very depressed. That, along with the many medications he needed to take, became too much for him, and he ended his suffering."

Discography

Albums
 Cuchi-Cuchi (1977) (with the Salsoul Orchestra)
 Olé Olé (1978) (with the Salsoul Orchestra)
 Bailando con Charo (Dancing with Charo, 1981) (with the Salsoul Orchestra)
 Guitar Passion (1994)
 Gusto (Pleasure, 1997)
 Charo and Guitar (2005)

Singles
 1976: "La Salsa"
 1977: "Dance a Little Bit Closer" (US Dance #18); UK #44
 1978: "Mamacita, ¿dónde está Santa Claus? (Mommy, Where's Santa Claus?)"
 1978: "Olé Olé" (US Dance #36)
 1979: "Sha Na Na"
 1979: "Stay with Me" (US Dance #55)
 1979: "Hot Love"
 1981: "La Mojada (Wet Back)"
 2003: "Prisionera De Tu Amor" (with Seductive Souls)
 2008: "España Cañi" (US Dance #14)
 2011: "Sexy Sexy" (US Dance #24)
 2013 "Dance a Little Bit Closer" (Charo & the Salsoul Orchestra vs. the Cube Guys Remix)

Filmography

Television

 The Danny Kaye Show (October 6, 1965)
 The Ed Sullivan Show (four episodes; 1965–67)
 Ironside_(1967_TV_series) (one episode; S05E19 "Find a victim", 1972)
 The Carol Burnett Show
 The Cher Show (May 14, 1975)
 The Tonight Show Starring Johnny Carson
 Rowan & Martin's Laugh In
Donny & Marie, 1976
 The Hollywood Squares (semiregular panelist; 1972–78, 1986–89, 1998–2004)
 The Charo Show (1976; unsold pilot for variety series)
 Chico and the Man (cast member from 1977 to 1978)  --  Aunt Charo
 Sha Na Na, Season 3
 The Love Boat (guest-starred in 10 episodes, 1977–84)  -- April Lopez
 Flying High (guest-starred in episode #9, 1978–1979)
 Fantasy Island (guest-starred in four episodes, 1981–84)
 The Facts of Life (guest appearance in 1985)
 The Jeffersons  (January 8, 1985)
 Marblehead Manor (February 18, 1988)
 Pee-wee's Playhouse Christmas Special (guest star; 1988)
 Mickey Mouse Works (special guest voiceover)
 That '70s Show (special guest appearance: "Red Sees Red" in 2000)
 The Brak Show (special guest star; 2001)
 The Surreal Life (cast member; 2004)
 So NoTORIous (Season 1, Episode 5 in 2006)
 I Love the '70s: Volume 2 (appearances in 2006)
 Chappelle's Show (guest appearance in 2006)
 Las Vegas
 Viva Hollywood! (new reality show on VH1; May 11, 2008)
 The Tonight Show with Jay Leno (special appearance April 17, 2008)
 Chelsea Lately (special appearance; July 24, 2008)
 The Tonight Show with Jay Leno (special appearance; December 18, 2008)
 RuPaul's Drag Race (guest performer; March 9, 2009)
 The Suite Life on Deck (special appearance as Esteban's mother; 2010)
 The Wendy Williams Show (Episode 363; aired October 5, 2010)
 Don't Trust the B---- in Apartment 23 (special appearance May 17, 2013)
 Hell's Kitchen (dining-room guest; May 26, 2015)
 Celebrity Wife Swap (aired June 17, 2015)
 Jane The Virgin (special appearance March 28, 2016)
 RuPaul's Drag Race (special appearance April 4, 2016)
 Dancing With the Stars (contestant during Season 24, 2017)
 RuPaul's Drag Race (special appearance March 13, 2020)

See also
 List of Spanish Americans
 Mononymous person
 Age fabrication

Notes

References

External links

 
 
 
 
  "Charo Baeza" episode of El Tiempo Vivido , first broadcast on 7RM in Murcia, Charo's home town: part 1, part 2, part 3, part 4, part 5

Living people
Age controversies
American women comedians
20th-century American actresses
American dance musicians
American women guitarists
American women singers
American television actresses
American voice actresses
Flamenco guitarists
Singers from the Region of Murcia
People from Murcia
Spanish dance musicians
Spanish emigrants to the United States
Spanish women singers
Spanish television actresses
Spanish voice actresses
Spanish women comedians
Women classical guitarists
Naturalized citizens of the United States
Year of birth missing (living people)
Las Vegas shows
Women in Latin music
21st-century American women
United Service Organizations entertainers